Saad Al Khayri (born 21 June 1995) is a Saudi Arabian professional footballer who plays as a right-back for Pro League side Al-Wehda.

Career
Al Khayri began his career with Al-Ettifaq where he was promoted from the youth team to the first team. On July 18, 2016, he was loaned out to First Division side Al-Orobah for 6 months. On August 31, 2017, he signed a 5-year contract with Al-Ettifaq tying him to the club until 2023. On 25 September 2020, Al Khayri joined Al-Batin on a season-long loan. On 1 September 2022, Al Khayri joined Al-Wehda on a three-year contract.

Career statistics

Club

References

External links 
 

1995 births
Living people
Association football defenders
Association football fullbacks
Saudi Arabian footballers
Ettifaq FC players
Al-Orobah FC players
Al Batin FC players
Al-Wehda Club (Mecca) players
Saudi First Division League players
Saudi Professional League players
Saudi Arabia youth international footballers